Marinette  is a rural community on the Eastern Shore of Nova Scotia, Canada, in the Halifax Regional Municipality. The first land grant here was given to David Redmond from Antrim, Ireland, in 1828.

References
Citations

Bibliography

Communities in Halifax, Nova Scotia
General Service Areas in Nova Scotia